and  are a pair of fictional characters appearing in the Street Fighter fighting game series. The characters are twin brothers known collectively as the  that made their debut in the original Street Fighter III.

Appearances
In their backstory, Yun and Yang were separated from their birth parents when they were young. They were raised by an adoptive grandfather who runs a restaurant in Hong Kong and have eight underground bosses as godfathers. By the time of Street Fighter III, the two brothers are the leaders of their local town. Yun, the elder of the two, is described as being more responsible, while his younger brother Yang is calmer and more analytical.

In Street Fighter III: 3rd Strike, Yun and Yang set off to fight a mysterious organization (Gills group, the Illuminati) threatening to take over their village. In their respective endings, Yun and Yang end up driving away Gill from their home town and the two return home to be greeted by their female friend Houmei and her younger sister Shaomei, who both harbor a respective crush on Yun and Yang.

After the Street Fighter III series, Yun appeared as a playable character Capcom vs. SNK 2, in the portable versions of Street Fighter Alpha 3 for the Game Boy Advance and PlayStation Portable and in Capcom Fighting Jam. They both later appeared as playable characters in Super Street Fighter IV: Arcade Edition.

The twins later made a cameo in Chun-Li's introductory cutscene in the console versions of Street Fighter IV and in again in her ending in Super Street Fighter IV. They also made a cameo in the Half Pipe stage in Street Fighter X Tekken.

Design and gameplay
The characters' boyish-youthful looks are emphasized. Yun wears a blue baseball cap with a yellow visor, a sleeveless white changshan, yellow wristbands, and black pants and sneakers, while Yang wears a sleeveless salmon changshan, yellow wristbands, black pants and sneakers. Yun's signature accessory is a skateboard. 
Street Fighter IV: Arcade Edition include alternate costumes for the characters where they are dressed as restaurant employees.

Yun and Yang have both been variously described as "lighting-quick", "speedy and offensive focused", and "perpetually-stuck-with-things-that-represent-popular-culture-from-a-decade-ago". Game designer Tomoshi Sadamoto explained in an interview published by Capcom that the developmental team wanted Yun and Yang to be popular: they were concepted to be flashier than Alex, the main character of Street Fighter III, and to use the game's parry system to highlight their kung fu techniques. Yun and Yang are the palette swaps of each other with an identical moveset in the original Street Fighter III, in which Yang is selectable as an alternate version of Yun. Ultimately, both characters have evolved to be distinct from each other. In 2nd Impact and 3rd Strike, Yang is a distinct selectable character with his own techniques and abilities and ending. Only Yun is as a playable character in Capcom vs. SNK 2, with Yang assisting in some of his special moves and super combos; this version of Yun appears again in the portable versions of Alpha 3 and in Capcom Fighting Jam.

Esports
Yun has been used by players to win the 3rd Strike tournament at the Tougeki – Super Battle Opera in 2004, 2006, 2007, 2009, 2010 and 2012, and the Super Street Fighter IV tournament in 2011 and 2012. He was also used to win the 3rd Strike tournament at the Evolution Championship Series in 2003, 2004, 2006 and 2009.

Reception
Yun and Yang have received varied commentary for each of their appearances in the Street Fighter series. IGN felt the twins immediately stood out among the mostly unfamiliar cast of characters of Street Fighter III due to the fact that they fought together, and felt that "this touch of magic" was lost in later appearances when the developers chose to split them into distinct playable characters. Matthew Razak from Destructoid expressed excitement over an announcement in September 2010 of the twins' inclusion into Super Street Fighter IV: Arcade Edition as playable characters. Matt Edwards from Eurogamer analyzed the gameplay capabilities of both characters in his review of Street Fighter IV: Arcade Edition, and noted that the siblings rely on "pressure-intensive play-styles" and share a dive kick manoeuvre but otherwise play very differently: Yun is the game's best "rushdown character" whose ability to "create shadows that mimic his attacks" could potentially turn the tide of a battle even on the verge of defeat, while Yang relies on "strong pokes" and "mix-ups" but with low damage output. On Yun's appearance, Edwards said he may look innocent, but at least he is not "Vanilla Sagat". Conversely, in his review of Arcade Edition for Destructoid, Brian Nicholsona called Yun and Yang "flat, uninspired hacks"; on their visual similarities, he commented that while it makes sense on a genetic level since the characters are twins, he felt it is not compelling visual design since they are distinct playable characters. In their analysis of gameplay balance between established and new playable characters for Street Fighter V, Craig Alphonse and Anne Ellis from Red Bull had a retrospective discussion about the balance issues surrounding Yun and Yang following their inclusion into Street Fighter IV. They claimed that while the game community for Street Fighter IV found decent methods to counter the twins, they implied that the twins were overpowered as they were widely considered to provide the best gameplay advantage and place very high on a "tier list" of viable fighting characters.

Both characters are popular and have appeared in numerous "top" character lists. GameDaily ranked them at number 20 on their 2009 list of best Street Fighter characters, adding that they both are equally useful. They were ranked at tenth place on UGO.com's 2010 list of best Street Fighter characters. They were also ranked at number 11 on the list of the best Street Fighter fighters by The Guardian that same year, noted for their gameplay uniqueness. IGN included Yun and Yang among the characters they wished to see in Street Fighter IV, and that they are reunited as one unit fighting together. 1UP.com listed Yang as one of the characters they wanted to see in Street Fighter X Tekken as "Yang is long overdue to show up in a new Capcom fighting game." Esteban Cuevas from CBR is of the view that of the three Bruce Lee-inspired characters in the Street Fighter franchise, Yun is more popular than Yang and Fei Long. On other hand, GamesRadar included Yun among the worst Street Fighter characters ever, commenting that "You would think that being a Kung-fu master, skateboarding, and wearing a hat would make you cool. Actually it makes you look like a complete tool. Weird." In a worldwide Street Fighter character poll held between 2017 and 2018, Yun is ranked at 18th place while Yang ranked at 51st place.

References

Fictional Chinese people in video games
Fictional Hong Kong people
Fictional martial artists in video games
Male characters in video games
Orphan characters in video games
Street Fighter characters
Twin characters in video games
Fictional skateboarders
Video game characters introduced in 1997
Fictional wushu practitioners
Adoptee characters in video games